The San Francisco Giants farm system consists of eight Minor League Baseball affiliates across the United States and in the Dominican Republic. Three teams are independently owned, while five—the San Jose Giants, two Arizona Complex League Giants squads, and two Dominican Summer League Giants squads—are owned by the major league club.

The Giants have been affiliated with the Double-A Richmond Flying Squirrels of the Eastern League since 2010, making it the longest-running active affiliation in the organization among teams not owned by the Giants. Their newest affiliate is the Eugene Emeralds of the Northwest League, which became the Giants' High-A club in 2021. The longest affiliation in team history was the 32-year relationship with the Triple-A Pacific Coast League's Phoenix Giants/Firebirds from 1966 to 1997.

2021–present
The current structure of Minor League Baseball is the result of an overall contraction of the system beginning with the 2021 season. Class A was reduced to two levels: High-A and Low-A. Low-A was reclassified as Single-A in 2022.

1990–2020
Minor League Baseball operated with six classes from 1990 to 2020. The Class A level was subdivided for a second time with the creation of Class A-Advanced. The Rookie level consisted of domestic and foreign circuits.

1963–1989
The foundation of the minors' current structure was the result of a reorganization initiated by Major League Baseball (MLB) before the 1963 season. The reduction from six classes to four (Triple-A, Double-AA, Class A, and Rookie) was a response to the general decline of the minors throughout the 1950s and early-1960s when leagues and teams folded due to shrinking attendance caused by baseball fans' preference for staying at home to watch MLB games on television. The only change made within the next 27 years was Class A being subdivided for the first time to form Class A Short Season in 1966.

1958–1962
The minors operated with six classes (Triple-A, Double-A, and Classes A, B, C, and D) from 1946 to 1962. The Pacific Coast League (PCL) was reclassified from Triple-A to Open in 1952 due to the possibility of becoming a third major league. This arrangement ended following the 1957 season when the relocation of the National League's Dodgers and Giants to the West Coast killed any chance of the PCL being promoted. The 1963 reorganization resulted in the Eastern and South Atlantic Leagues being elevated from Class A to Double-A, five of seven Class D circuits plus the ones in B and C upgraded to A, and the Appalachian League reclassified from D to Rookie.

New York Giants

References

External links
 Major League Baseball Prospect News: San Francisco Giants
 Baseball-Reference: San Francisco Giants League Affiliations

Minor League Affiliates
San Francisco Giants minor league affiliates